Väike-Maarja Parish is a rural municipality of Estonia, in Lääne-Viru County. It has a population of 5,421 (as of 1 January 2009) and an area of 457.39 km².

Settlements
Small boroughs
Kiltsi, Rakke, Simuna, Väike-Maarja
Villages
Aavere -  Aburi - Äntu - Ärina - Avanduse - Avispea - Ebavere - Edru - Eipri - Emumäe - Hirla - Imukvere - Jäätma - Kaavere -  Kadiküla - Kamariku - Kännuküla - Kärsa - Käru - Kellamäe - Kitsemetsa - Koila - Koluvere - Kõpsta - Koonu - Kurtna - Lahu - Lammasküla - Lasinurme - Liigvalla - Liivaküla - Määri -  Mäiste - Mõisamaa - Müüriku - Nadalama - Nõmme - Nõmmküla - Olju - Orguse - Padaküla - Pandivere - Piibe - Pikevere - Pudivere - Raeküla - Raigu - Räitsvere - Rastla - Salla - Sandimetsa - Sootaguse - Suure-Rakke - Tammiku - Triigi - Uuemõisa - Väike-Rakke - Väike-Tammiku - Vao - Varangu - Villakvere - Võivere - Vorsti

Climate

Religion

Notable natives
Aile Asszonyi, operatic soprano
Georg Lurich, wrestler
Johann Peter Hoffmann, owner of "Marienhof"

Gallery

International relations

Twin towns — Sister cities
 Hausjärvi, Finland (since 1989)
 Kaarma, Estonia
 Sirdal, Norway (since 1994)
 Sonkajärvi, Finland (since 1997)
 Tommerup, Denmark (1995–2007)

References

External links